Chung Won-shik (5 August 1928 – 12 April 2020) was a South Korean politician, educator, soldier, and author. He was the 21st Prime Minister of South Korea.

Life 
From 1951 to 1955, Chung served as an officer in the South Korean Army. Following that, he worked as a professor of Seoul National University. During his tenure as education minister, he established a reputation for toughness. President Roh Tae-woo named him Acting Prime Minister on 24 May 1991. On 8 July 1991, he was appointed Prime Minister of South Korea. He was one of three candidates for the mayor of Seoul in 1995. Chung died from kidney disease on 12 April 2020, aged 91.

See also 
 Lee Hoi-chang
 Goh Kun
 Chang Myon

References

1928 births
2020 deaths
South Korean anti-communists
South Korean educators
Prime Ministers of South Korea
Government ministers of South Korea
Deaths from kidney disease
Seoul National University alumni
Peabody College alumni